Gerard and Marcel Granollers were the defending champions but chose not defend their title.

Gong Maoxin and Zhang Ze won the title after defeating Hsieh Cheng-peng and Christopher Rungkat 6–4, 6–4 in the final.

Seeds

Draw

References
 Main draw

Doubles
Bangkok Challenger - Doubles
 in Thai tennis